William Berry (March 6, 1753 – August 29, 1824) was a Maine-born soldier during the American Revolution.

Early years
Born in Falmouth, Maine, a grandson of Captain George Berry, he was one of the earliest settlers of Buckfield, Maine having settled there thirteen years before the incorporation of the town.

Marriage
He married Joanna Doane in 1774. They had 11 children, five sons (Levi, William, George, Obadiah and Zerri) and six daughters (Mary [Polly], Dorcas, Joanna, Elizabeth, Sally, and Remember).

American Revolutionary War record
Corporal in Captain Benjamine Hooper's Company marched 1/25/1776 rolls made up to 5/30/1776 at Falmouth.

Private. Capt. William Crocher's Company. Col. Mitchell's Regiment. roll muster made up from 8/31/1776, 
discharged 11/23/1776,

Return of Capt. Samuel Knights Company in Falmouth pay due 11/1776- William Berry enlisted 7/8/1776.

Private . Capt. John Brachett marched in response to alarm of 4/19/1775 to headquarters. Service 5 days.

Post war
William Berry was a prime mover in establishing the first Baptist church in Buckfield, Maine and became a deacon.

References
Maine Historical & Gen. Records. Re. vol. 3, p. 210.
War service: Mass. soldiers & sailors of the Revolutionary War, vol 1, p. 998.
Buckfield Oxford County, Maine: From the Earliest Explorations to the close of the year 1900, Alfred Cole, Buckfield, 1915

1753 births
1824 deaths
Baptists from Maine
Massachusetts militiamen in the American Revolution
People from Falmouth, Maine
People of Maine in the American Revolution
People from Buckfield, Maine